NIRCam (Near-InfraRed Camera) is an instrument aboard the James Webb Space Telescope. It has two major tasks, as an imager from 0.6 to 5 micron wavelength, and as a wavefront sensor to keep the 18-section mirrors functioning as one. In other words, it is a camera and is also used to provide information to align the 18 segments of the primary mirror. It is an infrared camera with ten mercury-cadmium-telluride (HgCdTe) detector arrays, and each array has an array of 2048×2048 pixels. The camera has a field of view of 2.2×2.2 arc minutes with an angular resolution of 0.07 arcsec at 2 microns. NIRCam is also equipped with coronagraphs, which helps to collect data on exoplanets near stars. It helps with imaging anything next to a much brighter object, because the coronagraph blocks that light.

NIRCam is housed in the Integrated Science Instrument Module (ISIM), to which it is attached by struts. It is connected to the ISIM by struts and thermal straps connect to heat radiators, which helps maintain its temperature. The Focal Plane Electronics operated at 290 K.

NIRCam should be able to observe objects as faint as magnitude +29 with a 10,000-second exposure (about 2.8 hours). It makes these observations in light from  0.6 (600 nm) to 5 microns (5000 nm) wavelength. It can observe in two fields of view, and either side can do imaging, or from the capabilities of the wave-front sensing equipment, spectroscopy. The wavefront sensing is much finer than the thickness of an average human hair. It must perform at an accuracy of at least 93 nanometers and in testing it has even achieved between 32 and 52 nm. A human hair is thousands of nanometers across.

Main

Components

Wavefront sensor components include: 
Dispersed Hartmann sensors
Grisms
Weak lenses

Parts of NIRCam:
Pick-off mirror
Coronograph
First-fold mirror
Collimator lenses
Dichroic beam splitter
Longwave filter wheel
Longwave camera lens group
Longwave focal plane
Shortwave filter wheel assembly
Shortwave camera lens group
Shortwave fold mirror
Pupil imaging lens
Shortwave focal plane

Overview

NIRCam has two complete optical systems for redundancy. The two sides can operate at the same time, and view two separate patches of sky; the two sides are called side A and side B. The lenses used in the internal optics are triplet refractors. The lens materials are lithium fluoride (LiF), a barium fluoride (BaF2) and zinc selenide (ZnSe). The triplet lenses are collimating optics. The biggest lens has 90 mm of clear aperture.

The observed wavelength range is broken up into a short wavelength and a long wavelength band. The short wavelength band goes from 0.6 to 2.3 microns and the long wavelength band goes from 2.4 to 5 microns; both have the same field of view and access to a coronagraph. Each side of the NIRCam views a 2.2 arcminute by 2.2 arcminute patch of sky in both the short and long wavelengths; however, the short wavelength arm has twice the resolution. The long wavelength arm has one array per side (two overall), and the short wavelength arm has four arrays per side, or 8 overall. Side A and Side B have a unique field of view, but they are adjacent to each other. In other words, the camera looks at two 2.2 arcminute wide fields of view that are next to each other, and each of these views is observed at short and long wavelengths simultaneously with the short wavelength arm having twice the resolution of the longer wavelength arm.

Design and manufacturing 
The builders of NIRCam are the University of Arizona, company Lockheed Martin, and Teledyne Technologies, in cooperation with the U.S. Space agency, NASA. Lockheed Martin tested and assembled the device. Teledyne Technologies designed and manufactured the ten mercury-cadmium-telluride (HgCdTe) detector arrays. NIRCam was completed in July 2013 and it was shipped to Goddard Spaceflight Center, which is the NASA center managing the JWST project.

NIRCam's four major science goals include:

Electronics

Data from the image sensors (Focal Plane Arrays) is collected by the Focal Plane Electronics and sent to the ISIM computer. The data between the FPE and the ISIM computer is transferred by SpaceWire connection. There are also Instrument Control Electronics (ICE). The Focal Plane Arrays contain 40 million pixels.

The FPE provides or monitors the following for the FPA:
Regulated power
Output data synchronization
Temperature control 
Operational mode controls 
Image data conditioning
Image data amplification 
Image data digitization

Filters

NIRcam includes filter wheels that allow the light coming in from the optics to be sent through a filter before it is recorded by the sensors. The filters have a certain range in which they allow light to pass, blocking the other frequencies; this allows operators of NIRCam some control over what frequencies are observed when making an observation with the telescope.

By using multiple filters the redshift of distant galaxies can be estimated by photometry.

NIRcam filters:

Short wavelength channel (0.6–2.3 µm)
F070W - General purpose
F090W - General purpose
F115W - General purpose
F140M - Cool stars, 
F150W - General purpose
F150W2 - Blocking filter for F162M, F164N, and DHS
F162M - Cool Stars, off-band for 
F164N - [FeII]
F182M - Cool stars, 
F187N - Pa-alpha
F200W - General purpose
F210M - , 
F212N - 

Long wavelength channel (2.4–5.0 µm)
F250M - , continuum
F277W - General purpose
F300M - Water ice
F322W2 - Background min. Primarily used w/ grisms. Blocking filter for F323N.
F323N - 
F335M - PAH, 
F356W - General purpose
F360M - Brown dwarfs, planets, continuum
F405N - Br-alpha
F410M - Brown dwarfs, planets, 
F430M - , 
F444W - General purpose. Blocking filter for F405N, F466N, F470N.
F460M - CO
F466N - CO
F470N - 
F480M - Brown dwarfs, planets, continuum

Labeled diagram

See also
Optical Telescope Element
James Webb Space Telescope timeline
Near Infrared Camera and Multi-Object Spectrometer (defunct NIR Hubble instrument)
Wide Field Camera 3 (current NIR Hubble instrument)
MIRI (Mid-Infrared Instrument) (JWST's 5-28 micron camera/spectrograph)
Infrared Array Camera (Spitzer near- to mid-infrared camera)

References

External links

JWST NASA website - NIRCam
NIRCam
NIRCam gallery on Flickr
NIRCam pocket guide (2 page .pdf)
Slitless spectroscopy with the James Webb Space Telescope Near-Infrared Camera (JWST NIRCam) 

James Webb Space Telescope instruments
Space imagers